Clavus nodifera is a species of sea snail, a marine gastropod mollusk in the family Drilliidae.

This species is also mentioned as Clavus nodiferus.

Description

Distribution
This species occurs in the demersal zone of the Central Pacific Ocean off Hawaii.

References

 Kay, E. A. "Hawaiian Marine Shells. Reef and Shore Fauna of Hawaii. Section 4: Mollusca Bernice P. Bishop Museum Spec. Publ. 64 (4), 652 pp." (1979).
 Tucker, J.K. 2004 Catalog of recent and fossil turrids (Mollusca: Gastropoda). Zootaxa 682:1–1295

External links

nodifera
Gastropods described in 1860